Filaroides is a genus of nematodes belonging to the family Filaroididae.

The species of this genus are found in Northern America.

Species:

Filaroides arator 
Filaroides hirthi 
Filaroides martis 
Filaroides milksi 
Filaroides osleri

References

Nematodes